Wolani may refer to:
Wolani people, a people of the Papua province of Indonesia
Wolani language, the language of the Wolani people